Dendra Tyrnavou is a village and a community of the Tyrnavos municipality. Before the 2011 local government reform it was a part of the municipality of Tyrnavos. The 2011 census recorded 619 inhabitants in the village and 1,291 in the community. The community of Dendra Tyrnavou covers an area of 45.042 km2.

Administrative division
The community of Dendra Tyrnavou consists of three separate settlements: 
Agia Sofia (population 109)
Dendra Tyrnavou (population 619)
Platanoulia (population 563)

Population
According to the 2011 census, the population of the settlement of Dendra Tyrnavou was 619 people, an increase of almost 33% compared with the population of the previous census of 2001.

See also
 List of settlements in the Larissa regional unit

References

Populated places in Larissa (regional unit)
Tyrnavos